Zhang Ju (Chinese: 张炬; pinyin: Zhāng Jǜ) (May 17, 1970 – May 11, 1995), was a Chinese musician, best known as the founding bassist and backing vocalist for the seminal progressive metal band Tang Dynasty.

Early life and career 

Zhang was born into a Tujia family in Hunan province. As a child, he showed an interest in athletics, winning second place in the national high jump competition.  He received his first guitar as a birthday present during his first year of junior high school.

In 1987, Zhang formed a band with vocalist Gao Qi and guitarist Cao Ping, switching to bass as they did not yet have a bass player.  The band soon broke up due to ego clashes and musical differences.

Zhang founded Tang Dynasty in February 1989 with Ding Wu and Kaiser Kuo, serving as the band's lead vocalist until mid-1991. The band's eponymous debut album, released in December 1992 on Magic Stone Records, was an unprecedented success, selling around 900,000 legal copies, and is considered to be the first Chinese heavy metal album. Zhang sang lead and co-lead vocals on the track "Legend" and the band's cover of The Internationale, respectively. He sang backing vocals live in addition to handling bass duties.

Zhang Ju was very well-liked among the Beijing rock music circle. His apartment served as a gathering place for musicians, and was where the members of Tang Dynasty ate and slept from October 1989 through May 1990.

Zhang also contributed the majority of bass tracks on The Face's debut album, The Instinct of Fire, released in 1995. It would be his last recording before his death.

Death 
On May 11, 1995, Zhang was returning home via the Zizhuqiao Freeway Overpass after a rehearsal with The Face. At around 10 PM, his motorcycle collided with a truck at a poorly-lit intersection. Despite efforts to resuscitate him, Zhang died from his injuries, just six days shy of his 25th birthday. His death had a profound impact on the Chinese rock scene, elevating him to martyr-like status among fans. Zhang's funeral took place on October 26, 1995 at Lianggezhuang Palace in the Western Qing tombs, and was attended by a roster of famous Beijing rock musicians, including his own Tang Dynasty bandmates.  His motorcycle was subsequently displayed at Wang Yong's Keep in Touch rock club in Beijing.

Zhang's death put Tang Dynasty in a tailspin. The band split with Magic Stone and developed conflicts regarding artistic direction, nearly breaking up in 1996. Eventually, Tang Dynasty replaced Zhang with Breathing bassist Gu Zhong, who has since served as the group's bass player.

Tributes 
In 1997, a two-disc tribute album entitled Goodbye Zhang Ju, featuring interviews and songs by remaining members of Tang Dynasty as well as a number of Zhang's Beijing rock colleagues, was released.  One track, "Your Vision", was rerecorded for Tang Dynasty's second album, Epic.

In 2005, the compilation Gift was released to commemorate the tenth anniversary of his death.

Discography

Tang Dynasty

Studio albums 

 1992 - 唐朝 (Tang Dynasty) - bass (all tracks); backing vocals; lead vocals ("传说"); co-lead vocals

Live albums 

 1990 - 90现代音乐会 ('90 Modern Music Concert) - lead vocals/bass ("谁都希望"  and "粉雾")
 1995 - 摇滚中国乐势力 (Chinese Rock Forces: Live in Hong Kong) - bass/backing vocals ("飞翔鸟" and "选择")

The Face 

 1995 - 火的本能 (The Instinct of Fire) - bass (all tracks except "梦" and "欢乐颂")

Posthumous releases 

 1997 - 再见张炬 (Goodbye Zhang Ju) - two interviews and "无题"

References 

Chinese male musicians
Chinese bass guitarists
1970 births
1995 deaths
Musicians from Hunan
Chinese heavy metal musicians
Progressive metal bass guitarists
Motorcycle road incident deaths
Male bass guitarists
20th-century bass guitarists
20th-century male musicians
Tujia people
Road incident deaths in the People's Republic of China